Ultrabeat is an English electronic music group. Ultrabeat may also refer to:

Ultrabeat: The Album, the band's debut album
Ultrabeat (Swedish band), a Christian electronic rock band
Ultrabeat (netlabel), an early netlabel active in the 1990s
Ultrabeat, a drumbeat program on Apple's Logic Pro